Inchmay was the name of two ships operated by the Inch Steamship Co:

, ex Empire Gazelle, in service 1946–54
, ex Empire Cromer, in service 1955–66

Ship names